Quixinge is a commune in the municipality of Quiçama, Luanda Province, Angola.

Transport 
It is served by an extension of a branch railway of the northern railway.

See also 
 Railway stations in Angola

References 

Communes in Luanda Province
Populated places in Luanda Province